The Parassinkkadavu Snake Park is located in Anthoor Municipality about  from Kannur Corporation in the Kannur district of north Kerala, in south India.

Snakes on Exhibition
The park houses a variety of snakes and other small animals, including the Spectacled cobra, King Cobra, Russell's viper, Krait and various pit vipers. There is also a large collection of non-venomous snakes including pythons. The park is dedicated to the preservation and conservation of snakes, many species of which are gradually becoming extinct. In a live show, trained personnel play and 'interact' with a variety of snakes, including cobras and vipers, and try to quell mythical fears and superstitions about snakes.

Snake Bite Treatment Center
Pappinisseri Visha Chikitsa Society (Snake Bite Treatment Center) was started in the year 1964 at Pappinisseri, Kannur, Kerala with an intention to treat the ailing especially those suffering from snake envenomation. This institution is commemorated on behalf of the Late Sri. C.P. Kumaran Vaidyar and functions as the center for advanced clinical Research and literary documentation in Agada Tantra. Ever since its inception in 1964 it had the monopoly in treating snake bite cases and more than a million snake bite cases were treated and clinically documented.

The main physician for Pappinisseri Visha Chikitsa Kendra was Dr B Prabhakaran for a long time.

Destruction of the park - 1993

This park has a long back story of destruction which owed to a political revenge. The political issues lead the party followers to vandalise and set fire to the park. Many rare species of reptiles like 2 king cobras, other birds and animals were brutally burnt to death.

Gallery

See also
 Parassinikkadavu
 Dharmashala, Kannur
 Mayyil
 Mangattuparamba

References

External links

Zoos in Kerala
Tourist attractions in Kannur district
Snakes
Dharmashala, Kannur
Buildings and structures in Kannur district
Education in Kannur district
Year of establishment missing